Thelymitra simulata, commonly called the collared sun orchid, is a species of orchid that is endemic to south-eastern Australia. It has a single fleshy, channelled leaf and up to six blue flowers with small darker spots. It grows in higher altitudes places part and the flowers have a purple lobe with a yellow tip on top of the anther.

Description
The lobe on the top of the anther is brownish purple with a yellow tip and small teeth. The side lobes have mop-like tufts of white hairs. Flowering occurs in December and January but the flowers are self-pollinated and only open on hot days.

Taxonomy and naming
Thelymitra simulata was first formally described in 1998 by David Jones and the description was published in Australian Orchid Research. The specific epithet (simulata) is a Latin word meaning “imitate" or "copy", referring to the similarity of this species to T. × truncata.

Distribution and habitat
The collared sun orchid grows in montane and subalpine grassland, woodland and forest in New South Wales, the Australian Capital Territory, Victoria and Tasmania.

References

External links
 
 

simulata
Endemic orchids of Australia
Orchids of New South Wales
Orchids of the Australian Capital Territory
Orchids of Victoria (Australia)
Orchids of Tasmania
Plants described in 1998